Daniel Fernández (born 4 February 1985) is a Belgian judoka.

Achievements

References

1985 births
Living people
Belgian male judoka
20th-century Belgian people
21st-century Belgian people